The Vero Centre (constructed as the Royal & SunAlliance Centre) is a skyscraper office tower in Auckland, New Zealand. Constructed in 2000 and designed by architect Peddle Thorp, after its construction it became the tallest building in New Zealand surpassing The Metropolis. The centre contains a health club and gymnasium, main entry public foyer, retail outlets in the 5 podium levels, and 32 office levels. It was New Zealand's tallest office tower until June 2019 when the Commercial Bay Commercial Bay (skyscraper) PwC Tower was topped out. It is also known for its 'halo' roof feature.

While atypically tall compared to the surrounding area, its construction is considered to have had a positive effect on the regeneration of the eastern Auckland CBD area. The site had previously been occupied by a number of vacant lots and low-rise buildings, including student accommodation, industrial warehouses and massage parlours.

The developer's design process made use of the "bonus provisions" of the District Plan, allowing them to build more floor area in exchange for public benefits such as displayed works of art and a public plaza. The value of these to the general public has however been called into question by some. Also criticised has been the lack of connection between the two frontage streets through the building.

The building received several awards for energy efficiency (such as the RICS International Award for Building Efficiency and
Regeneration in 2001 and the EnergyWise Award 2004), and has been calculated to use around 10% less energy than the average New Zealand Property Council building. The building houses a number of commissioned artworks, including Coral, by New Zealand sculptor Peter Roche.

See also
List of tallest buildings in Auckland
List of tallest structures in New Zealand

References 

Skyscrapers in Auckland
2000s architecture in New Zealand
Skyscraper office buildings in New Zealand
Office buildings completed in 2000
Auckland CBD